Oslnovice is a municipality and village in Znojmo District in the South Moravian Region of the Czech Republic. It has about 70 inhabitants.

Geography
It lies in the Jevišovice Uplands. Southern and eastern municipal border is formed by the Thaya River and by the upper Vranov Reservoir, built on the river.

History
The first written mention of Oslnovice is in a deed of King Ottokar I of Bohemia from 1228.

After the Thirty Years' War, many Germans immigrated to Oslnovice and the village became ethnically mixed. At the end of the 19th century, most of the Germans moved away and the village became completely Czech again.

Economy
Oslnovice is mainly an agricultural village.

Sights
The main landmark is the Chapel of the Sacred Heart. It is an Art Nouveau chapel decorated by Jano Köhler, which was moved to Oslnovice from Brno-Královo Pole in 1969. There is also the Chapel of the Virgin Mary from around 1820.

References

External links

Villages in Znojmo District